The celestial monarch (Hypothymis coelestis) is a species of bird in the family Monarchidae, and one of the most attractive of all the monarch flycatchers, with its spectacular blue crest and large greenish-yellow wattle. It is endemic to the Philippines with its extant range being in Luzon, Samar, Mindanao Tawi-Tawi and Basilan and it being possibly extinct on Negros and Sibuyan Island. It is often observed in mixed flocks with other birds such as  blue fantails, rusty-crowned babblers, rufous paradise flycatchers, both short-crested monarchs and black-naped monarchs and other small forest birds. Its natural habitat is tropical moist lowland forests up to 750 masl. It is one of the most sought after birds by birdwatchers in the Philippines and in the world.

Description and taxonomy
Ebird describes the celestial monarch as "A fairly small, rather long-tailed bird of lowland forest. Has turquoise wings and tail, an indigo chest and neck, a pale blue crown and crest, and a white belly. The male is brighter blue and has a longer crest than the female. Similar to Black-naped monarch but has a crest. Also similar to, Short-crested monarch, but is paler blue with a longer crest. Song is a short series of clear piping notes, ”pii-pii-pii.”
These birds exhibit  sexual dimorphism in which the males have much longer crests and a more intense coloration overall while the females having shorter crests, less intense blue colors and a generally smaller size. Males are known to raise their crests when agitated, usually seen in response hearing other males or sensing a threat.

The diet of the celestial monarch consists of insects. 

An alternate name for the celestial monarch is the celestial blue monarch.

Subspecies
Two subspecies are recognized:
 H. c. coelestis - Tweeddale, 1877: Found on Luzon, Samar, Dinagat, Mindanao, Basilan and Tawi-Tawi.
 H. c. rabori - Rand, 1970: Found on Sibuyan and Negros. This subspecies has not been recorded in Negros since 1959 and in Sibuyan in the 1990s  and may now be extinct.

Habitat and conservation status
Its natural habitat is tropical moist lowland forests up to 750 meters above sea level but usually much lower. It is believed to be a riverine specialist especially in areas with a distinct dry season. It is often seen in the canopy.           

IUCN has assessed this bird as vulnerable with estimates the population to be just 1,000 to 2,499 mature individuals remaining with the population continuing to decrease due to habitat loss.           

Lowland forests is the most threatened type of forest in the country. This is due to them being deforested for high-value lumber and destroyed through Slash-and-burn or kaigin. This bird is now extremely rare in Luzon with most records now being in Mindanao and Samar. Majority of the records in Mindanao are in Bislig, Surigao del Sur which has faced rapid destruction in the past few years after the company that once owned a concession was closed down in 2005 and was overrun with illegal logging and converted into exotic monoculture plantations which cannot support these birds. This beautiful insectivore is declining rapidly, with recent surveys revealing its presence at only 10 sites with many local extinctions occurring in its former range. The West Visayas sub-species rabori is now feared extinct. Widespread and continuing reduction of its lowland habitat leaves its population severely fragmented and its status is vulnerable according to the Red Data Book of Threatened Birds of Asia.The Philippine Red List goes further lists the celestial monarch as critically endangered.           

It has been recently recorded in the protected areas in the Northern Sierra Madre Natural Park and Samar Island Natural Park and two further sites proposed for conservation funding on Tawi-Tawi and Dinagat Islands. However, these "protected" areas face lax protection and enforcement from Illegal logging and land conversion.   there are no species specific conservation plans.

References

 del Hoyo, J., Elliott, A. and Sargatal, J. (2006) Handbook of the Birds of the World Volume 11: Old World Flycatchers to Old World Warblers. Lynx Edicions, Barcelona.
 Burnie, D. (2001) Animal. Dorling Kindersley, London.
 Mittermeier, R.A., Gil, P.R., Hoffmann, M., Pilgrim, J., Brooks, T., Mittermeier, C.G., Lamoreux, J. and Da Fonseca, G.A.B. (2004) Hotspots Revisited. CEMEX, Mexico City.
Allen (2020), Birds of the Philippines p.254

External links
BirdLife Species Factsheet.
Species Information at ARKive.
Celestial Monarch videos on the Internet Bird Collection.

celestial monarch
Endemic birds of the Philippines
celestial monarch
Taxonomy articles created by Polbot